Barakoma Airfield is a former World War II airfield on Vella Lavella in the Solomon Islands archipelago.

History

World War II
The U.S. 35th Infantry Regiment landed on Vella Lavella on 15 August 1943 as part of the Solomon Islands campaign. The 58th Naval Construction Battalions landed with the Army and began building support facilities despite frequent Japanese air attacks. In August 1943 the Seebees surveyed and cleared a site for an airfield and began building a coral-surfaced  by  fighter runway. Airfield facilities such as a signal tower, operations room, aviation-gasoline tanks, and camp for operating personnel, were completed in September and the first landing was made on 24 September. By November 1943 an aviation-gasoline tank farm of six 1,000-barrel tanks, with a sea-loading line was operational.

US Navy units based at Barakoma included:
VF-40 operating F6Fs

USMC units based at Barakoma included:
VMF-212 operating F4Fs
VMF-214 operating F4Us
VMF-215 operating F4Us
VMF-221 operating F4Us
VMF-321 operating F4Us
VMF(N)-531 operating PV-1 Venturas

On 15 June 1944 the airfield was abandoned and all salvageable materials were dismantled and removed by 12 July 1944.

Postwar
The airfield is overgrown with vegetation.

See also
Munda Airport
Ondonga Airfield
Segi Point Airfield
United States Army Air Forces in the South Pacific Area

References

Airfields in the Pacific theatre of World War II
Airfields of the United States Navy
Military installations closed in 1944
Airfields of the United States Army Air Forces in the Pacific Ocean theatre of World War II
Closed installations of the United States Navy